Lasiochlaena is a fungal genus in the family Fomitopsidaceae. It is a monotypic genus, containing the single species Lasiochlaena anisea, found in Europe. The genus was circumscribed by Czech mycologist Zdenek Pouzar in 1990.

References

Fomitopsidaceae
Fungi of Europe
Monotypic Polyporales genera
Taxa described in 1990